Deborah Stedman-Scott, Baroness Stedman-Scott,  (born 23 November 1955) is a Conservative member of the House of Lords and the former Chief Executive Officer of Tomorrow's People Trust. She had served as Parliamentary Under-Secretary of State for Work and Pensions from 2019 until 2023.

Early life and education
Born in Paddington, London, she is the daughter of Jack and Doreen Margaret Scott and was educated at Ensham Secondary School for Girls, Southwark Technical College and the Salvation Army Training College.

Career
Stedman-Scott has worked for National Westminster Bank 1972–1976, for the Salvation Army 1978–83 and for Tunbridge Wells Chamber of Commerce 1983–84. She joined Tomorrow's People Trust in 1984, a charity working with unemployed people. She held various roles there, rising through the ranks to become Chief Executive from 2005 to 2015. The UK Charity Awards 2005 named her Charity Principal of the Year. 

She was appointed a Deputy Lieutenant for East Sussex in 2007 and an Officer of the Order of the British Empire (OBE) in the 2008 New Year Honours. 

On 12 July 2010, Stedman-Scott was created a life peer as Baroness Stedman-Scott, of Rolvenden in the County of Kent. She was appointed to be a government whip (Baroness-in-Waiting) on 27 October 2017. 

On 30 July 2019, Stedman-Scott was appointed Parliamentary Under-Secretary of State for Work and Pensions in the first Johnson ministry. On 17 September 2021, she took on additional responsibility as Parliamentary Under-Secretary of State for Women at the Foreign, Commonwealth and Development Office, in the second cabinet reshuffle of the second Johnson ministry.

She is also a Trustee of New Devon Opera and New Philanthropy Capital.

Personal life
She entered into a civil partnership with Gabrielle Joy Stedman-Scott in 2006.

References

External links
Official Biography House of Lords

1955 births
Living people
English LGBT politicians
Deputy Lieutenants of East Sussex
Officers of the Order of the British Empire
Conservative Party (UK) life peers
Life peeresses created by Elizabeth II
Lesbian politicians
LGBT life peers